Prognathodes geminus, the twin butterflyfish, is a species of marine ray-finned fish, a butterflyfish belonging to the family Chaetodontidae. It is found in the Western Central Pacific, around Caroline Island and Palau Island.

References

geminus
Taxa named by Joshua M. Copus
Taxa named by Richard Pyle
Taxa named by Brian Greene
Taxa named by John Ernest Randall
Fish described in 2019